The Winschoterdiep is a canal in the province Groningen of the Netherlands. It leads to the Rensel, which is actually part of this canal. Construction was started in 1618 and finished in 1634. The Winschoterdiep's total length is 35.5 kilometres, and it is approximately 100 metres in width. Sixteen bridges and locks are built across this canal, as well as many other passages. Ships must be less than 16 m in breadth to pass through some of these.  It is one of the oldest canals ever built in Groningen still in use. In the section between Hoogezand and Waterhuizen, there are several shipwharfs. Hoogezand was founded near the canal  in 1618.

Where the canal runs through the municipality of Menterwolde, there is significant water-sport activity in season.

Notes

External links
Hoogezand-Sappemeer (The Netherlands)
History of the Jews in Groningen, the Netherlands
History of Zuidbroek
Ferus Smit Shipyards

Canals in the Netherlands
Bodies of water of Groningen (province)
Canals opened in 1634
1634 establishments in the Dutch Republic